Two-Fisted Tales is a 1992 American made-for-television anthology horror film consisting of three separate segments, based on the EC Comics publication Two-Fisted Tales. Only one of the stories is actually adapted from a story appearing in an issue of EC Comics.

Plot

Cast
 William Sadler – Mr. Rush (Presenter)

Segment: "Showdown"
 David Morse – Tom McMurdo
 Neil Giuntoli – Billy Quintaine
 Roderick Cook – Cornelius Bosch
 Thomas F. Duffy – Scorby
 Monty Bass – Frank Little Bear
 Mel Coleman – Blacksmith
 Grant Gelt – Little Boy
 Paul T. Murray – Harley
 Tommy Townsend – Big Bart

Segment: "King of the Road"
 Raymond J. Barry – Garrett
 Brad Pitt – Billy
 Michelle Bronson – Carrie
 Jack Kehler – Mole
 Alva L. Petway – Dispatcher

Segment: "Yellow"
 Kirk Douglas – Sr. Calthrob
 Eric Douglas – Jr. Calthrob
 Lance Henriksen – Ripper
 Dan Aykroyd – Milligan
 Dominick Morra – Priest
 Steve Boyum – King
 Chuck Picerni Jr. – Jones
 R. David Smith – Soldier

Production
In 1991, the comic book was adapted for a TV pilot by producers Joel Silver, Richard Donner, Robert Zemeckis and others. Apart from an opening montage of covers from the comic book and use of comic's logo, the pilot had little connection with Kurtzman's creation. In imitation of EC's horror books, the hour-long anthology drama featured the ghostly gunfighter Mr. Rush (Bill Sadler) as a host and a device to connect the segments, although Kurtzman's war-adventure stories had never been introduced by a host. Two of the stories, "Showdown" (written by Frank Darabont and directed by Richard Donner) and "King of the Road" (written by Randall Jahnson and directed by Tom Holland), were original scripts and not adaptations from EC (although "Showdown" did share a title with a story from issue 37). The third story, "Yellow" (written by Jim Thomas & John Thomas and A. L. Katz & Gilbert Adler and directed by Robert Zemeckis), was adapted from a story written by Al Feldstein and illustrated by Jack Davis for the first issue of EC's Shock SuspenStories.

Broadcast
Although it contains a 1991 copyright notice at the end of the credits, the pilot had a single telecast in the USA on January 18, 1992, generating little interest, and "Showdown" and "King of the Road" were later extracted to become individual episodes of HBO's Tales from the Crypt television series (though "Yellow" had been broadcast as an episode in the year before).

References

External links 
 

1992 films
1992 horror films
1992 television films
1990s comedy horror films
American auto racing films
American supernatural horror films
American comedy horror films
1990s English-language films
American horror anthology films
American horror television films
Films based on American comics
Films produced by Walter Hill
Films produced by Joel Silver
Films directed by Richard Donner
Films directed by Tom Holland
Films directed by Robert Zemeckis
Films scored by Michael Kamen
Films scored by Alan Silvestri
Carolco Pictures films
Fox network original films
Television pilots not picked up as a series
1992 comedy films
Films with screenplays by Jim Thomas (screenwriter)
Films with screenplays by John Thomas (screenwriter)
1990s American films